This article gives an incomplete list of locomotives used by the   Ferrocarril de Antofagasta a Bolivia (FCAB).

FCAB has bought only few new diesel locomotives. Instead, starting in 1978, they have bought a wide range of second hand engines (some in scrap condition) from various railway companies in South America, Newfoundland and Australia. Most locomotives are EMD types, with the exception of one Alco engine (1201) and two Davenport shunters. The Australian units were built by EMD licensee, Clyde Engineering. Thus, for most practical purposes, these are EMD locomotives.

Notes

See also
 Electro-Motive Diesel
List of GM-EMD locomotives

References

Metre gauge railways in Chile
Rolling stock of Bolivia
Rolling stock of Chile
2 ft 6 in gauge railways in Chile